Wazobia 93.7 FM Onitsha is a Nigerian Pidgin English radio station in Onitsha, Anambra State. It was founded in 2018 and belongs to Globe Communications Limited.

Known for its humorous approach to broadcasting, Wazobia FM Onitsha airs a mixture of news, features, sport, music (from popular Nigerian music, hip hop, highlife to world music and reggae), talk shows, topical issues and interviews.

The station is currently being managed by Molokwu Kryss(Kryss'D Boss)

Shows 

 Una wake up show(6am – 10am Mon to Fri)
 Oga madam office show(10am – 2pm Mon to Fri)
 Kulele Zone(2pm – 6pm Mon to Fri)
 Evening Oyoyo(6pm – 10pm Mon to Fri)
 Saturday Mende Mende
 Sunday Mende Mende

Presenters 

 Kryss Molokwu(Kryss d'boss)

 Akwaugo 1
 Akpors Baba(Odogwu Makanaki)
 DJ Juicy (Radio Jagaban)
 Area Mama
 Joseph Jaho(Radio Governor)
 Doreen Obianukor
 Double O(Sports)
 Angel Gabriel(Sports)
 Kachy(Sports)

See also 

 List of radio stations in Nigeria
 Media of Nigeria
 Wazobia FM Port harcourt

References

External links 
 

Radio stations in Nigeria
Privately held companies of Nigeria
World music radio stations
Radio stations in Onitsha
Wazobia FM